Kielce Voivodeship - a unit of administrative division and local government in Poland in years 1921–1939. At that time, it covered northern counties of the historic province of Lesser Poland, including such cities as Radom, Częstochowa and Sosnowiec. On 1 April 1938, its borders changed, see: Territorial changes of Polish Voivodeships on 1 April 1938. Capital city: Kielce.

Location and area

In early 1939, Voivodeship's area was 22 204 square kilometers. It was located in central Poland, bordering Germany and Autonomous Silesian Voivodeship to the west, Łódź Voivodeship and Warsaw Voivodeship to the north, Lublin Voivodeship and Lwów Voivodeship to the east and Kraków Voivodeship to the south. Landscape was flat in the northern part and hilly in mid and south, with the Świętokrzyskie Mountains located in the heart of the area. Forests covered 21.2%, with the national average 22.2% (as for January 1, 1937).

Population

According to the 1931 Polish census, the population was 2 671 000. Poles made 88.9% of population, Jews - 10.7%. The latter preferred to live in the cities and towns - in 1931 Jews made 28.7% of Voivodeship's cities inhabitants. Illiterate (in 1931) was 25.7%, higher than the national average of 23.1%.

Industry

Kielce Voivodeship was very divided in industrial terms. Its western part, with such cities as Częstochowa, Sosnowiec or Będzin was highly industrialized and urbanized, with numerous coalmines. Also Radom, located in the north, was a big industrial center, together with newly built or newly industrialized nearby towns Pionki and Starachowice. Eastern part, on the other hand, was backward, with little industry and underdeveloped agriculture. In mid-1930s Polish government started a huge public works program, called Centralny Okreg Przemyslowy, which was a great boost to overpopulated and poor central and eastern counties.

Cities and administrative divisions

Between April 1, 1938, and September 1, 1939, it consisted of 18 powiats (counties). These were:
 Będzin county (area 459 km², pop. 231 300),
 Częstochowa county (area 1 855 km², pop. 182 600),
 city of Częstochowa county (powiat czestochowski grodzki), (area 48 km², pop. 117 200),
 Iłża county (area 1 835 km², pop. 162 400),
 Jędrzejów county (area 1 277 km², pop. 108 800),
 Kielce county (area 2 052 km², pop. 244 100),
 Kozienice county (area 1 857 km², pop. 143 100),
 Miechów county (area 1 353 km², pop. 153 700),
 Olkusz county (area 1 361 km², pop. 151 300),
 Opatów county (area 1 639 km², pop. 186 500),
 Pińczów county (area 1 148 km², pop. 126 000),
 Radom county (area 2 095 km², pop. 166 900),
 city of Radom county (powiat radomski grodzki) (area 25 km², pop. 77 900),
 Sandomierz county (area 1 186 km², pop. 124 400),
 city of Sosnowiec county (powiat sosnowiecki grodzki) (area 33 km², pop. 109 000),
 Stopnica county (area 1 590 km², pop. 153 200),
 Włoszczowa county (area 1 446 km², pop. 101 600),
 Zawiercie county (area 945 km², pop. 131 000).

According to the 1931 census, biggest cities in Kielce Voivodeship were:
 Częstochowa (pop. 117 200),
 Sosnowiec (pop. 109 000),
 Radom (pop. 77 900),
 Kielce (pop. 58 200),
 Będzin (pop. 47 600),
 Dąbrowa Górnicza (pop. 36 900),
 Zawiercie (pop. 32 900),
 Ostrowiec Świętokrzyski (pop. 25 900).

Voivodes
Stanisław Franciszek Pękosławski 19 November 1919 – 31 May 1923
Adam Kroebl 1 July 1923 – 31 August 1923 (acting)
Mieczysław Bilski 1 September 1923 – 6 May 1924
Ignacy Manteuffel 24 May 1924 – 17 August 1927
Adam Kroebl 20 August 1927 – 20 October 1927 (acting)
Władysław Korsak 21 October 1927 – 28 February 1930
Jerzy Paciorkowski 18 February 1930 – 15 May 193
Stanisław Jarecki 17 May 1934 – 9 July 1934 (acting)
Władysław Dziadosz 9 July 1934 – September 1939

See also
Poland's current Świętokrzyskie Voivodeship

References
 Maly rocznik statystyczny 1939, Nakladem Glownego Urzedu Statystycznego, Warszawa 1939 (Concise Statistical Year-Book of Poland, Warsaw 1939).

 
Former voivodeships of the Second Polish Republic
History of Lesser Poland